Natalie Sumner Lincoln ( – ) was an American novelist who wrote mystery and crime novels mostly set in her native Washington, DC. 

Her brother was political reporter George Gould Lincoln. She was educated at Laura A. Flint's Private School in Washington. 

Lincoln was society editor for the Washington Herald from 1912 to 1914.  She was editor of the Daughters of the American Revolution Magazine from April 1915 until her death. 

Lincoln wrote 22 novels, all but one set in Washington DC.  About half of them featured either Inspector Mitchell or Detective Ferguson of the Washington, DC police.   Two of her novels were adapted as silent films: The Man Inside (1916) and Black Shadows (1920), the latter based on her novel The Official Chaperon.  She also contributed short stories to a number of magazines, including Smith's Magazine, McCall's, All Story, and Detective Story Magazine.

She made philatelist headlines in 1930 when she discovered one of her father's letters with a rare postmaster provisional stamp from Baltimore postmaster James M. Buchanan, which she sold for $10,000.

Natalie Sumner Lincoln died at her Hawthorne Street home in Washington, D.C. on August, 31 1935.

Bibliography 
Inspector Mitchell

 I Spy (1916)
 The Nameless Man (1917)
 The Moving Finger (1918)
 The Three Strings (1918)
 The Cat's Paw (1922)
 The Meredith Mystery (1923)
 The Missing Initial (1925)
 The Blue Car Mystery (1926)
 The Dancing Silhouette (1927)
 P.P.C. (1927)

Detective Ferguson

 The Red Seal (1920)
 The Unseen Ear (1921)

Other novels

 The Trevor Case (1912)
 The Lost Despatch (1913)
 The Man Inside (1914)
 C.O.D. (1915)
 The Official Chaperon (1915)
 The Thirteenth Letter (1924)
 The Secret of Mohawk Pond (1928)
 The Fifth Latchkey (1929)
 Marked "Canceled" (1930)
 13 Thirteenth Street (1932)

References

External links

Created via preloaddraft
1881 births
1935 deaths
Writers from Washington, D.C.
American mystery novelists